Teams in the National Collegiate Athletic Association (NCAA) retire jersey numbers of players who either are considered by the team to have made significant contributions to that team's success, or who have experienced untimely deaths during their playing career. As with other leagues, once a team retires a player's jersey number, it never issues the number to any other player, unless the player or team explicitly allows it.

History 
Since NCAA teams began retiring numbers, many players have had their jersey number retired. Pittsburgh has the most retired numbers of the team with 10. Unlike professional leagues, no one player has had his number retired by two teams.

Unlike major sports leagues in the United States such as MLB (which retired Jackie Robinson's number 42) and the NHL (which did so for Wayne Gretzky's 99), the NCAA has never retired a jersey number league-wide in honor of anyone. 

Nevertheless, there are some cases of retirement of a same number honoring two different players, such as Houston, which retired number 7 worn by David Klingler and Case Keenum, among other similar cases.
 
Moreover, Michigan retired a number for three players, the #11 in honor of the Wistert brothers. The same did Brigham Young University (BYU), retiring number 6 for three different footballers, Marc Wilson, Robbie Bosco, and Luke Staley. 

Since 2005, Syracuse holds the record of players honored with a number retirement after the University retired no. 44 worn by 25 different players between 1921 and 1998.

There are also some strange cases such as UCLA retiring #42 for Jackie Robinson although he worn no. 28 as a footballer at the institution; however, the school chose to retire No. 42 because it was more identified with him after Robinson wore that number throughout his Hall of Fame baseball career with the Brooklyn Dodgers.

Retired numbers 

Notes

See also 
 List of NFL retired numbers

References 

r
f